Ibán Javier Cuadrado Alonso (born 21 February 1979) is a Spanish former professional footballer who played as a central defender.

He amassed Segunda División totals of 248 games and five goals over the course of eight seasons, mainly in representation of Real Murcia. He also spent four years in La Liga, two apiece with that club and Málaga for a total of 62 matches.

Club career
Cuadrado was born in Salamanca, Region of León. A product of La Liga giants FC Barcelona, he would play almost exclusively for their B team in both the second and third divisions. Courtesy of Louis van Gaal, he appeared in one UEFA Champions League game with the main squad, featuring one minute in a 2–0 group-stage away win over Brøndby IF on 9 December 1998.

Released by the Catalans in 2001, Cuadrado signed with Real Murcia, where he would be an indispensable element throughout seven seasons, helping to two promotions (although he appeared in just ten matches in the 2007–08 campaign, which ended in La Liga relegation).

Subsequently, Cuadrado joined Málaga CF, recently promoted to the top flight, where he was only third or fourth choice. On 14 January 2010 he moved to Rayo Vallecano, signing with the second-tier side until the end of that season and the next. He made his debut three days later, starting in the 4–4 home draw against Hércules CF and scoring an own goal.

After one unsuccessful season with Rayo individually, the 31-year-old Cuadrado switched to SD Ponferradina of division two, reuniting with former Málaga teammates Javi López, Daniel Toribio and Miguel Ángel. In summer 2011, following his team's relegation, he returned to his hometown and signed with lowly UD Salamanca.

Cuadrado moved abroad for the first time in his career at the age of 34, joining Chinese Super League's Shanghai SIPG FC. In March 2015 he switched clubs but stayed in the nation, transferring to Guizhou Hengfeng Zhicheng F.C. from the League One.

In October 2018, Cuadrado returned to the Camp Nou, as youth assistant coach.

Notes

References

External links

1979 births
Living people
Sportspeople from Salamanca
Spanish footballers
Footballers from Castile and León
Association football defenders
La Liga players
Segunda División players
Segunda División B players
Tercera División players
FC Barcelona C players
FC Barcelona Atlètic players
FC Barcelona players
Real Murcia players
Málaga CF players
Rayo Vallecano players
SD Ponferradina players
UD Salamanca players
Chinese Super League players
China League One players
Shanghai Port F.C. players
Guizhou F.C. players
Spanish expatriate footballers
Expatriate footballers in China
Spanish expatriate sportspeople in China
FC Barcelona non-playing staff